The 2022–23 Penn Quakers women's basketball team represented the University of Pennsylvania during the 2022–23 NCAA Division I women's basketball season. The Quakers, led by thirteenth-year head coach Mike McLaughlin, played their home games at the Palestra aa members of the Ivy League. The Quakers qualified for the Ivy League women's tournament for the fourth time but lost to Princeton in the semifinals. Penn lost to Richmond in the first round of the 2023 WNIT.

Previous season
Penn finished the previous season 12–14, 7–7 in Ivy League play. They failed to qualify for the 2022 Ivy League women's basketball tournament.

Roster

Schedule

|-
!colspan=8 style=| Regular season

|-
!colspan=8 style=| Ivy League regular season

|-
!colspan=9 style=| Ivy League Women's Tournament

|-
!colspan=8 style=| WNIT

See also
 2022–23 Penn Quakers men's basketball team

References

Penn
Penn Quakers women's basketball seasons
Penn
Penn